Sulakocetus is an extinct genus of toothed whale. It was first described by G.A. Mchedlidze in 1976 with the type species S. dagestanicus. Initially classified as part of family Waipatiidae, further research has called its taxonomic placement into question. A review in 1990 indicated that it should be excluded from the superfamily Platanistoidea. A further assessment in 2016 stated that it should not be classified with the Waipatiidae, and left its status for further review, essentially rendering it incertae sedis.

References

External links 
 Sulakocetus at the Paleobiology Database

Oligocene cetaceans
Prehistoric cetacean genera
Fossil taxa described in 1976
Extinct animals of Russia